A Damsel in Distress is a 2015 musical written by Jeremy Sams and Robert Hudson, with music and lyrics by George Gershwin and Ira Gershwin. A romantic comedy, the musical is based on the novel A Damsel in Distress by P. G. Wodehouse, the 1928 play adapted from the novel, and the 1937 musical comedy film A Damsel in Distress based on the novel and play. The musical ran from 30 May to 27 June 2015 at Chichester Festival Theatre.

Main cast

 Richard Fleeshman as George
 Summer Strallen as Maud Marshmoreton
 Desmond Barrit as Keggs
 Isla Blair as Lady Caroline Byng
 Richard Dempsey as Reggie Byng
 Nicholas Farrell as Lord Marshmoreton
 Sally Ann Triplett as Billie Dore
 Melle Stewert as Alice
 Chloe Hart as Dorcas
 David Seadon Young as Pierre

Production

The director and choreographer was Rob Ashford, the designer was Christopher Oram, and the musical supervisor was David Chase. The musical director was Alan Williams, the orchestrator was Bill Elliott, the lightning designer was Howard Harrison, and the sound designer was Paul Groothuis. Gabrielle Dawes and James Orange were the casting directors.

Musical numbers

Act 1
 "Overture" – Orchestra
 "Things Are Looking Up" – Billie and Ensemble
 "Put Me To The Test" – George, Billie
 "Mine" – Lord Marshmoreton
 "The Jolly Milkmaid And The Tar" – Keggs, Reggie, Alice
 "Nice Work If You Can Get It" – Maud, Alice
 "Feeling I’m Falling" – George
 "I’m A Poached Egg" – Reggie
 "You Are You" – George, Alice, Reggie, Lord Marshmoreton, Lady Caroline
 "Stiff Upper Lip" – Billie, Pierre, Keggs, Dorcas and Ensemble
 "Evening Star" – Maud
 "Feeling I’m Falling (Reprise)" – George
	
Act 2
 "Entr’acte" – Orchestra
 "I Can't Be Bothered Now" – Billie and Ensemble
 "Love Walked In" – Lord Marshmoreton, Billie
 "French Pastry Walk" – Dorcas, Pierre and Ensemble
 "Soon" – Maud, George, Billie
 "Mine (Reprise)" – Lord Marshmoreton, Billie
 "Fidgety Feet" – Reggie, George and Ensemble
 "Sing Of Spring" – Lady Caroline
 "I’m A Poached Egg (Reprise)" – Reggie, Alice
 "Mine (Reprise II)" – Lord Marshmoreton, Billie
 "A Foggy Day" – George
 "Finale" – Full Company

Reception
Reviews were generally positive. BritishTheatre.com: "Sams and Hudson have done an excellent job of adapting this work for the stage, inventing and re-inventing parts of Wodehouse’s original wheel. The dialogue is snappy and effervescent, and the tone light and supple throughout. There might be a tad too much emphasis on George’s artistic angst than is strictly necessary or properly explained, but that does not really get in the way of the roller coaster of frivolity that the duo has here penned."

The Stage: "In an age of metamusicals from The Producers to the current Broadway hit Something Rotten, which offer their own ironic commentaries on the genre itself, A Damsel in Distress is both blissfully affectionate yet never affected as a young Broadway composer (Richard Fleeshman) and a British socialite (Summer Strallen) are set on an tangled but inevitable course towards each other in a dizzying, but always sincere, series of romantic collisions. Rob Ashford directs and choreographs an absolutely luxurious cast that includes hilarious turns from Richard Dempsey, Isla Blair and Desmond Barrit, and the brassily brilliant Sally Ann Triplett as the leading showgirl."

The Telegraph: "While complex characterization was perhaps not one of Wodehouse’s main preoccupations (there are several sour little quips around George’s desire to create serious, incomprehensible 'art', rather than mere shallow, enjoyable 'entertainment'), both Summer Strallen as Maud and Richard Fleeshman as George bring a sparky edge to their obstacle-filled romance, while the late-blooming love between Nicholas Farrell as Lord Marshmoreton, who always wanted to marry a showgirl, and Sally Ann Triplett as the girl of his dreams, equally at home on the stage or in the pigsty, is genuinely touching."

References

2015 musicals
Musicals based on novels
British musicals
Adaptations of works by P. G. Wodehouse